Uyvar Eyalet was an eyalet of the Ottoman Empire. 

It was established during the reign of Mehmed IV. In 1663 the Ottoman expeditionary force led by Köprülü Fazıl Ahmed defeated the Habsburg Monarchy's garrison of the city of Uyvar (today known as Nové Zámky, Slovakia) and conquered the region. In 1664, they lost the northern part along with the fortresses Hlohovec, Nitra and Levice. The Peace of Vasvár recognised Ottoman control over the remaining part of the eyalet. It was returned to Austria after the signing of the Treaty of Karlowitz in 1699.

Residents of Uyvar paid 50 Akçe per head for Jizya as compared with the standard rate of one gold ducat (equivalent in the period to around 200 Akçe). The province's payment of a yearly sum of 1,090,150 Akçe to the treasury by 20,183 non-Muslim Jizya payers, amounting to 50 Akçe per head.

Administrative divisions

The sanjaks of Uyvar Eyalet in the 17th century:
 Sanjak of Leve 
 Sanjak of Novigrad
 Sanjak of Holok
 Sanjak of Boyák
 Sanjak of Nitra 
 sanjak of uyvar

Sources

External links
Map of Uyvar Eyalet

Eyalets of the Ottoman Empire in Europe
Ottoman period in Slovakia
Ottoman period in Hungary
1663 establishments in the Ottoman Empire
1685 disestablishments in the Ottoman Empire